UK Conformity Assessed (UKCA) marking is a conformity mark that indicates conformity with the applicable requirements for products sold within Great Britain.

The UKCA marking became part of UK law at the end of the Brexit transition period, on 31 December 2020, with the coming into force of The Product Safety and Metrology etc. (Amendment etc.) (EU Exit) Regulations 2019. It has been mandatory since then, although, until 31 December 2024 (an extended deadline, which was previously 1 January 2022 then 31 December 2022), the CE mark is accepted as a valid alternative. The scope and procedures of the UKCA scheme will initially follow those for CE marking, but after 31 December 2020 the two schemes may diverge.

Initial guidance regarding UKCA marking was originally published by the Government of the United Kingdom in 2019 ahead of a potential no-deal Brexit but subsequently withdrawn.

Characteristics of UKCA marking
The height of the UKCA marking must be at least . If reduced or enlarged its proportions have to be kept. The marking should be "easily visible, legible, and [from 1 January 2023] permanently attached to the goods".

Northern Ireland
The UKCA marking only applies to products placed on the market in Great Britain. In Northern Ireland, which remains aligned to the European Single Market due to the Northern Ireland Protocol, CE marking continues to be required. UK-resident bodies are no longer qualified to carry out CE mark conformity assessments for goods intended for the EU, but under the Northern Ireland Protocol may do so for Northern Ireland. Where a UK body has carried out the assessment for goods intended for Northern Ireland, the product should display both the CE mark and a UKNI mark. However, goods intended for export to the EU must be assessed by an EU-resident body and carry a CE mark (and must not carry the UKNI mark).

As part of the British Government's policy of "unfettered access" for "qualifying Northern Ireland goods" to be sold in Great Britain without restriction, goods may be sold in Great Britain using the relevant Northern Ireland markings, and without any additional approvals that would be required for the UKCA marking.

See also
 Registration, Evaluation, Authorisation and Restriction of Chemicals#In non-EU countries for the proposed "UK REACH".
 European Committee for Standardization and European Committee for Electrotechnical Standardization: the UK remains a member of these European Standards bodies.

Notes

References

Certification marks
Brexit replacement schemes
2020 establishments in the United Kingdom
Symbols introduced in 2020